Parai Zameen is a Sindhi film released on 14 August 1958. It was directed by Shaikh Hassan, produced by A. G. Mirza and starred Talib Ali.

See also
 Sindhi cinema
 List of Sindhi-language films

Further reading
 Gazdar, Mushtaq. 1997. Pakistan Cinema, 1947-1997. Karachi: Oxford University Press.

Sindhi-language films
Pakistani drama films
1958 films